Modern Times is Al Stewart's sixth studio album, released in 1975. The album was re-released in 2007 with bonus tracks. A further remastered (by Paschal Byrne) edition was released by Esoteric Recordings in 2015.

Track listing
All tracks composed by Al Stewart except as indicated.

1975 original LP edition
Side 1
"Carol" – 4:24
"Sirens of Titan" – 2:50
"What's Going On?" – 3:34
"Not the One" – 4:34
"Next Time" – 4:19

Side 2
"Apple Cider Re-Constitution" – 5:19
"The Dark and the Rolling Sea" – 5:21
"Modern Times" (Dave Mudge, Stewart) – 8:21

2000 Beat Goes On edition bonus tracks
"News from Spain" - 6:03
"Elvaston Place" - 2:53
"Swallow Wind" - 3:21

2007 Collector's Choice Music edition bonus tracks
"Swallow Wind" - 3:23
"A Sense of Deja Vu" - 4:50
"Willie the King" - 4:01

Personnel
Al Stewart - vocals, acoustic guitar
Brian Bennett - backing vocals
David Ellis - acoustic guitar
Isaac Guillory - guitar
Simon Nicol - acoustic guitar
Tim Renwick - electric guitar
Andrew Powell - orchestral arrangement on "Modern Times"
Tony Carr - percussion
Gerry Conway - drums
Stuart Cowell - dobro, electric guitar
Barry De Souza - drums
George Ford - bass
Neil Lancaster - backing vocals
Chas Mills - backing vocals
Peter Moss - bass, fuzz bass
Graham Smith - harmonica
Pete Wingfield - keyboards
Peter Wood - keyboards, accordion
Technical
Alan Parsons - engineer, string arrangement on "Apple Cider Re-Constitution"
Peter James - engineer
Hipgnosis - sleeve design, photography

Charts
Album – Billboard (United States)

Notes 

 "Sirens of Titan" is based on the novel of the same name by Kurt Vonnegut.
 The original enigmatic album cover photograph was taken in the grounds of Stone House, Rushlake Green, near Heathfield in Sussex. In Britain this cover photo was superseded in 1977 by a portrait photo of Al Stewart, presumably in order to capitalise on his enhanced popularity as a result of the Year of the Cat album.
 The blonde woman on the album cover is Pink Floyd guitarist David Gilmour's first wife, Ginger. The Cord automobile Stewart is sitting in belonged to Led Zeppelin guitarist Jimmy Page.
 Centered in the cover, holding a mirror reflecting a bright light toward the viewer, as on Stewart's previous album, Past, Present and Future, the U. S. version of the album features the Marvel Comics character Doctor Strange.

References

Al Stewart albums
1975 albums
Albums with cover art by Hipgnosis
Albums produced by Alan Parsons
CBS Records albums
Janus Records albums